Abdul Qadir Jilani (Abdolqāder Gilāni) is a Sunni scholar and jurist. He was born on December 14, 1935 (Ramadan, 1354 AH) in a village called Sandhu Sayyidan, Rawalpindi, Pakistan. He was born to Walayat Ali Shah Gilani and is a descendant of Abdul Qadir Gilani. He is based in Walthamstow, East London.

Major work
In 2010, Jilani published his book, Zubdah at-Tahqiq. Written in Urdu, it is a text on the companions of Muhammad and the difference of opinion amongst Sunni scholars regarding the status of Abu Bakr as the greatest companion.

Ofcom ruling
In October 2011, Jilani appeared as a guest on Rehmatul Lil Alameen, a programme on UK television station DM Digital. During the broadcast, Jilani made comments with reference to the shooting dead in early 2011 of the Punjab governor Salmaan Taseer.

Following a complaint, Ofcom subsequently ruled that by broadcasting the comments, DM Digital had breached Rule 3.1 of the Broadcasting Code, which states “Material likely to encourage or incite the commission of crime or to lead to disorder must not be included in television or radio services”. Ofcom ruled that, "on a reasonable interpretation of the scholar's remarks, he was personally advocating that all Muslims had a duty to attack or kill apostates or those perceived to have insulted the Prophet. We considered that the broadcast of the various statements made by the Islamic scholar outlined above was likely to encourage or incite the commission of crime."

In response, it was made clear that Jilani was commenting on the law of Pakistan in relation to those who were alleged to have profaned the character of the Muhammad. In this instance, Jilani was discussing the case of Mumtaz Qadri who had been sentenced to death by the Court of Pakistan for killing the governor Salmaan Taseer. In conclusion if the comments were taken literally, then Jilani's comments could be offensive to some in the UK, however it should be made clear that the speech was delivered in the Urdu language and he was referring to the laws, customs and practices of Pakistan.

References

1935 births
Living people
Pakistani Sunni Muslim scholars of Islam
People from Rawalpindi
Pakistani Sufis
Pakistani emigrants to the United Kingdom